M. Ummer (born 1 July 1953) is an Indian politician and social worker from Kerala, India. He is a Member of Legislative Assembly from the Manjeri constituency in Malappuram district. He started his political career through the Indian Union Muslim League.

Early life and education
Ummer was born the son of M. Moideen Haji and Smt. Ayisha; born at Karuvarakundu. He has completed a Bachelor of Laws (LLB) degree.

Positions held
He is the active worker of Indian union Muslim League and also Was President, District Panchayat, Malappuram; Chairman, District Panchayat Welfare Standing Committee; President, Karuvarakundu Grama Panchayat; Treasurer, Muslim League District Committee; Director, K.M.M.L.Now, Working Committee Member, Kerala State Muslim League; Member, Wakf Board; Secretary, Darul Najath Orphanage and allied institutions.

References

1953 births
Living people
Indian Union Muslim League politicians
Kerala MLAs 2016–2021